Wichenford is a village and civil parish (with Kenswick)  in the Malvern Hills District in  the county of Worcestershire, England. It lies  7 miles (11km) to the north-west of the city of Worcester and has a population of c 400 for around 250 households. Primary education is provided at nearby Hallow, and at Martley, which also has a secondary school.

History

Two Roman coins were found in the parish of Wichenford during an excavation at Woodend Farm which took place a few years before 1848. The coins are from the times of Victorinus and Constans of the early 4th century.

During the Anglo-Saxon period, Wichenford was gifted by Offa of Mercia (The Midland King) to the Church of Worcester in the later part of the 8th century.

A church or chapel has existed at Wichenford from early times with mention of a chapel which was attached to the church of St. Helen, Worcester around 1234. Parts of the present church of St. Lawrence date from about 1320.

The manor of Wichenford belonged to the Washbourne or Washburn family, and there are two monuments with effigies and family heraldry in the church. It is said that the estate came into the Washbourne family from Margaret le Poher (d. 1454) who stabbed a French prisoner to death in Wichenford Court. Another version of this story is given in the 1979 The Story of Wichenford, in which it says that around the year of 1400, a battle took place a few miles north of Wichenford on Woodbury Hill between forces loyal to Henry IV of England and Owain Glyndŵr from Wales who was supported by a contingent of French troops. A French nobleman was captured and brought to Wichenford Court where he was murdered by Margaret Washbourne, a story which has persisted through the centuries, and there is allegedly still a bloodstain on the landing of the Court from the stabbed French gentleman. According to Robert Peach's 1896 history of the Washbourne family, it was actually one of the Bourbon Princes who was confined and put to death by Lady Washbourne.

In 1651, John Washbourne of Wichenford arrived at Pitchcroft in Worcester with "forty horse" to support Charles II of England. Although it is not clear what happened to him, he may have been killed at the subsequent Battle of Worcester as there is no reference to him after that and his wife was recorded as a widow in 1653. 

Wichenford Court, a partly moated manor house, has a timber-framed 17th-century dovecote, now in the care of the National Trust. 17th-century panelling from Wichenford Court was removed to decorate Kenswick Manor by the Britten family in 1895.

Following the Poor Law Amendment Act 1834 Wichenford Parish ceased to be responsible for maintaining the poor in its parish. This responsibility was transferred to Martley Poor Law Union.

The school, now closed, was built in Wichenford in 1847.

The Wichenford branch of the Women's Institute was started in 1944. In the 1950s, the parish council arranged for Queen's Estate to be constructed and to make sure that the residents were able to park their cars.

Wichenford parish was joined with Kenswick parish, which had its own chapel, in 1972 for local government arrangements. In 1973, the parish council erected a bus shelter near Castle Hill and installed the first street lighting in the village which was at Queen's Estate. 

Julius Falconer's 2010 publication The Wichenford Court Murder is an entirely fictional story set in the 20th century and has no connection or coverage of the murder at Wichenford Court that took place in the early 1400s.

No Shops
Until the mid-1990s Wichenford had both a village shop with Post Office and a village bakery, both now closed down. The two shops were situated at opposite sides of the village green, in the centre of the village. Wichenford also has a pub, the Mason's Arms, which is situated on the road to Martley and is not near the village centre.

Open Gardens and Village Fete
Every two years (the "odd" years) a number of the village's gardens are opened by their owners over a weekend in June. The 2017 event made in excess of £10,000. Proceeds go to local charities. In even numbered years, a Fete is held in mid-July at The Memorial Hall. This popular event raises very welcome funds which are distributed to local good causes.

Millennium Green
In the year 2000 the Millennium Green was opened.

Village Hall
Wichenford Memorial Hall  stands opposite the church and is used by local societies and for a variety of functions. The hall has modern kitchen facilities and a "committee room" with a bar area.

There is a "War Memorial" plaque to those from the village that have lost their lives while serving their country.

Notable residents
 Thomas Washbourne (1606–1687), poet.
 Charles Colville, 5th Viscount Colville of Culross, lived for at time at Abingdon Cottage.

References

Bibliography

External links
 Kenswick & Wichenford Parish information

Villages in Worcestershire
Civil parishes in Worcestershire
Malvern Hills District